Greatest Hits is a compilation album by the British blues rock band Fleetwood Mac released on CBS Records in the United Kingdom in 1971. The album assembles the band's hit singles in the UK covering the period from the band's beginning in 1968 to 1971, mostly in its original incarnation led by guitarist Peter Green. It peaked at No. 36 on the UK Albums Chart.

Background and content

Part of the second British blues boom of the late 1960s, during that time Fleetwood Mac enjoyed six British hit singles, collated here along with one non-charting single, two B-sides, and three album tracks. The band's UK single "Black Magic Woman" received greater exposure in the US when it was covered by the American group Santana, who placed their version in the Billboard Top 40.

A very similar release with the same title and same cover was released by Sony BMG in 1989, but consisted of the tracks from The Pious Bird of Good Omen plus "Shake Your Moneymaker" and "Love That Burns". Another identically-titled but entirely different 1988 Greatest Hits album concentrates exclusively on post-1975 material and has no tracks in common with either this release or the 1989 one.

The album gatefold shows a full-size photo of the post-Green line up of the band with Christine McVie (née Perfect), even though she just plays piano on a couple of tracks and was not a full member until after Kiln House was released. Long out of print, it was replaced on compact disc by the 2002 compilation The Best of Peter Green's Fleetwood Mac on the Sony International label, which now owns the Columbia/CBS catalogue. It was reissued on vinyl in 2010, however.

"The Green Manalishi", "Oh Well", "Rattlesnake Shake", and "Dragonfly" were licensed from Warner Bros. Records.

Track listing

Personnel
Peter Green – vocals, guitar, harmonica
Jeremy Spencer – vocals, slide guitar, piano, maracas
Danny Kirwan – vocals, guitar
John McVie – bass guitar
Mick Fleetwood – drums, percussion
Christine McVie – piano

Charts

References

1971 greatest hits albums
Albums produced by Mike Vernon (record producer)
Fleetwood Mac compilation albums
Albums produced by Peter Green (musician)
Albums produced by Jeremy Spencer
Albums produced by Danny Kirwan
Albums produced by John McVie
Albums produced by Mick Fleetwood